This is a list of awards won and nominations for Masters of Sex, an American drama television series that debuted on Showtime on September 29, 2013. The series stars Michael Sheen and Lizzy Caplan.

By award

Primetime Emmy Awards

Critics' Choice Awards

Writers Guild of America Awards

Golden Globe Awards

Satellite Awards

AFI Awards 
2013

Best Television Program of The Year

References 

Masters of Sex